To be unicameral is to have only one legislative or parliamentary chamber.

Unicameral may also refer to:

 The Unicameral, the supreme legislative body of the State of Nebraska
 Unicameral alphabet, an alphabet that has no case for its letters